Ram Chandra Maheshwari was an Indian politician from state of Madhya Pradesh. He was an M.L.A to Madhya Pradesh Legislative Assembly. Subsequently, he was elected as Deputy Speaker of Madhya Pradesh Legislative Assembly, died in 2005.

Notes

2005 deaths
Deputy Speakers of the Madhya Pradesh Legislative Assembly
Year of birth missing
Janata Party politicians
Madhya Pradesh MLAs 1977–1980